The Alicante is a mythical Mexican snake.

References

Mexican culture
Legendary serpents
Mythological monsters
Mexican mythology
Spanish-language Mesoamerican legendary creatures